Jowzjan (also Romanized as Jowzjān and Jowz Jān; also known as Jūzān and Juzjūn) is a village in Nasrovan Rural District, in the Central District of Darab County, Fars Province, Iran. At the 2006 census, its population was 925, in 208 families.

References 

Populated places in Darab County